The second Dombrovskis cabinet was the government of Latvia from 3 November 2010 to 25 October 2011.  It was the second government to be led by Valdis Dombrovskis, who was Prime Minister between 2009 and 2014.  It took office on 3 November 2010, after the October 2010 election, succeeding the first Dombrovskis cabinet, which had lasted from 2009 to 2010.  It was replaced by the third Dombrovskis cabinet on 25 October 2011, after the September 2011 election.

Government of Latvia
2010 establishments in Latvia
2011 disestablishments in Latvia
Cabinets established in 2010
Cabinets disestablished in 2011